Heena Panchal is an Indian actress known for her works in Hindi and Marathi language films. She is most famous for her item songs "Balam Bambai" and "Bevda Bevda Zalo Mi Tight". In 2019, she participated in Bigg Boss Marathi. Since February 2020, she has been a participant of the dating reality television series Mujhse Shaadi Karoge.

Filmography 
 2014: Hum Hai Teen Khurafaati
 2014: Life Mein Twist Hai
 2014: Manus Ek Mati
 2015: Just Gammat
 2015: Miss Tanakpur Haazir Ho
 2015: Yagavarayinum Naa Kaakka (Tamil)
 2015: Rathna Manjari
 2015: Lodde (Kannada)
 2016: Malupu (Telugu)
 2017: Babuji Ek Ticket Bambai 
 2017: Shentimental
 2018: When Obama Loved Osama
 2018: Vantas
 2018: Jaane Kyun De Yaaron
 2018: Tu Tithe Asave
 2018: Kay Zala Kalana
 2019: Perfume
 2019: Dhumas

Television

Controversy
She was being investigated in a massive rave & drug racket. She got arrested in farmhouse at Igatpuri, Nashik including 22 persons with her.

References

External links 

 
 

Living people
Indian film actresses
Actresses in Hindi cinema
Actresses in Marathi cinema
Actresses from Mumbai
21st-century Indian actresses
Year of birth missing (living people)
Bigg Boss Marathi contestants